Harleya is a genus of Mesoamerican flowering plants in the daisy family.

The genus is named for Prof. Harley Harris Bartlett, 1886–1960.

Species
There is only one known species, Harleya oxylepis, native to Belize, Tabasco, and the Yucatán Peninsula.

References

Monotypic Asteraceae genera
Vernonieae
Flora of North America